Émile Dufranc (born 1895) was a Belgian fencer. He competed in the individual foil competition at the 1920 and the 1924 Summer Olympics.

References

1895 births
Year of death missing
Belgian male fencers
Belgian foil fencers
Olympic fencers of Belgium
Fencers at the 1920 Summer Olympics
Fencers at the 1924 Summer Olympics